Lipowe may refer to the following places in Poland:
Lipowe, Limanowa County, village in the administrative district of Gmina Limanowa, within Limanowa County, Lesser Poland Voivodeship, in southern Poland

See also 
Lipowe Pole Plebańskie, village in the administrative district of Gmina Skarżysko Kościelne, within Skarżysko County, Świętokrzyskie Voivodeship, in south-central Poland
Lipowe Pole Skarbowe, village in the administrative district of Gmina Skarżysko Kościelne, within Skarżysko County, Świętokrzyskie Voivodeship, in south-central Poland